Dennis L. Gilbert (born October 7, 1943 in Bremerton, Washington) is a professor emeritus and former chair of sociology at Hamilton College in Clinton, New York. He holds a Doctor of Philosophy degree from Cornell University and has taught at the Universidad Católica in Lima, Peru, Cornell University, and joined Hamilton college in 1976. He has published a variety of sociology books, mainly dealing with socio-economic stratification.

Gilbert may be best known for his series of books entitled The American Class Structure. The class models featured in the series are used by other sociologists such as James Henslin, Brian K. Williams and Carl M. Wahlstrom. His main areas of expertise are Latin America, social stratification, polling, and more specifically the American class structure. He developed the Gilbert model, a popular way of classifying people into social classes.

List of publications
Since 1981, Dennis Gilbert has published the following books according to Amazon.com:
 Mexico's Middle Class in the Neoliberal Era, 2007, 
 The American Class Structure in an Age of Growing Inequality: multiple editions including 2018 (10th), 2010 (8th), 2002 (6th), and 1998 (5th).
 The American Class Structure: A New Synthesis, 1992
 Sandinistas: The Party and the Revolution, 1990,

See also

 Gilbert model

References

1943 births
American social sciences writers
American sociologists
Cornell University alumni
Living people